Hugo de Sadeleer (born 16 July 1997) is a professional racing driver from Switzerland, formerly competing in the LMP2 category of the European Le Mans Series.

Career

Karting
Born in Lausanne, Sadeleer began karting in 2009 at the age of twelve. He finished 11th in the 2009 Swiss Rotax Max Challenge Mini.

Formula BMW 
Sadeleer graduated to single-seaters in 2012, partaking in 10 races of the 2012 Formula BMW Talent Cup finishing 8th in the overall standings.

Formula Renault 2.0
In 2013, Sadeleer signed with Tech 1 racing to participate in the Formula Renault 2.0 Alps. Because of existing regulations that drivers must be over the age of 16, he was not allowed to participate in the championship and instead took part in testing. Sadeleer participated in the 2014 Formula Renault 2.0 Alps Series. He finished the season in 16th position with one podium finish at the Pau Grand Prix.

In 2015, Sadeleer graduated to the more competitive Formula Renault Eurocup championship. He participated in 17 races and finished the championship in 24th place.

In 2016, Sadeleer participated in the 2016 Eurocup Formula Renault 2.0 championship. He participated in 14 races, achieving one victory in Spa-Francorchamps and 3 podiums. He finished the season in 6th place.

Sportscars
On 12 January 2017, team owner Zak Brown announced Sadeleer would drive for United Autosports in the 2017 European Le Mans Series championship. He drove the team's new Ligier JSP217 in the LMP2 category. It was also announced that Sadeleer would participate in the 2017 24 Hours of Le Mans. He was joined in the cockpit by American driver Will Owen. The third driver was announced to be Filipe Albuquerque.

It was announced that Sadeleer would rejoin United Autosports for the 2018 European Le Mans Series and the 2018 24 Hours of Le Mans. For the ELMS campaign, he was be joined in the cockpit by Will Owen and Wayne Boyd. The third driver for the 24 Hours of Le Mans was Juan Pablo Montoya.

Racing Record

Career summary

* Season still ongoing.
† As de Sadeleer was a guest driver, he was ineligible for points.

Complete European Le Mans Series results

* Season still in progress.

24 Hours of Le Mans results

24 Hours of Daytona results

Complete Blancpain GT World Challenge Europe results
(key) (Races in bold indicate pole position) (Races in italics indicate fastest lap)

References

External links
 
 
 

1997 births
Living people
Swiss racing drivers
Formula Renault 2.0 Alps drivers
Formula Renault 2.0 NEC drivers
Formula Renault Eurocup drivers
24 Hours of Le Mans drivers
WeatherTech SportsCar Championship drivers
24 Hours of Daytona drivers
Sportspeople from Lausanne
Blancpain Endurance Series drivers
European Le Mans Series drivers
Asian Le Mans Series drivers
ADAC GT Masters drivers
NASCAR drivers
Tech 1 Racing drivers
United Autosports drivers
W Racing Team drivers
Jota Sport drivers
R-Motorsport drivers
Racing Engineering drivers
Formula BMW drivers